General Colton may refer to:

 General Joseph Colton, the original "G.I. Joe"
 Roger B. Colton (1887–1978), US Army officer active during World War II

See also
 Colton Greene (1833–1900), a Confederate general during the American Civil War